Serpantinka is the informal name for the place of detention and execution at the times of Stalinism. Though never officially found by any expedition it is believed to be located somewhere in the Kolyma region. It was under control of Sevvostlag (a directorate of the Gulag), and the local NKVD troika used it as the second major place for the enforcement of their death sentences during the Great Terror. The few survivors recall "Serpantinka" as one of the most brutal sites, even among Stalin's camps in the Kolyma area.

Background
In the early thirties, the Soviet leadership decided to start accelerated development of the Kolyma River basin in a very remote and sparsely populated region in the north-east of the USSR, where rich deposits of gold and tin were found. To accomplish this task, a "special type industrial complex" was created, known under the abbreviation "Dalstroy". An important role in these plans was played by the so-called Corrective labor camps, where prisoners had to work in extremely severe conditions. These camps in the Kolyma region were under the control of Sevvostlag, which was only formally subordinate to the 'Main Directorate of Camps'. Despite the cruel exploitation of prisoners, initially the local governance was not interested in their deaths. This situation changed with the start of the Great Terror, when many thousands of people who were already in the camps were sentenced to death. The attitude towards the prisoners also deteriorated sharply, among other things the length of the working day was increased from 10 to 16 hours. This led to mass death of prisoners from backbreaking work, hunger and disease. At this time, many prisoners in Kolyma camps were convicted of "political" (cont-revolutionary) crimes (45.8% at 1939). However, sometimes there were even fewer people convicted of ordinary crimes — for example, in 1938 there were only 16.3% of them in the camps of the Southern Mining Administration, and 76.8% were "counter-revolutionaries".

Location

So-called Serpantinka was located near the village of Khatenakh or Khatynnakh, now non-existent (not to be confused with a village in the Sakha Republic). Presumably, it was located in the place where the road from this village towards the village of Yagodnoye twisted along the slopes (serpantine is the Russian name for a hairpin turn). Nearby flows a stream called "Sniper". One of the testimonies, that Robert Conquest cites, claims that on the site of the future camp there were a few barracks, called Serpantinnaya, in which the road-building unit had been located. By the time the NKVD decided to use this place for setting up a camp, the road was completed and the place had been empty for over a year.

Regime in the camp and organization of executions 
Serpantinka, according to testimonies, was a small camp - a few barracks (more precisely, three), a house for officials and guards, and a garage. The garage was an unusual object for such a small camp, especially since there were already large garages nearby. The testimonies describe that the number of prisoners was too large for such a small camp. Trying to describe the incredible tightness in the barracks, they use such images as "a man was dying and could not fall", "people could not free their hand to take pieces of ice (they were given instead of water) and caught them with their mouths" and the like. In such conditions, prisoners could spend many days waiting for their turn to be shot. When the execution began, the engines of the tractors in the garage were turned on so that their noise drowned out the sounds of the shots. The bodies of the dead were taken away on sledges in an unknown direction. The inmates assumed that they were dumped into some kind of pit or buried in parallel trenches on the slope.

One of the witnesses wrote in his memoirs:

Very few documents have survived concerning the organization of the Great Terror at low levels. However, there is a unique correspondence between the local departments of the NKVD, located in the village of Khatynnakh, with the NKVD Directorate, located 375 miles away, in Magadan. The cases of the prisoners were considered as follows: for example, on 29 January 1938, the head of the regional NKVD department of the Road Construction Directorate sent to Magadan 30 formalized case records, "approved" by the NKVD "troika" for Dalstroy two days before in the village of Orotukan (something like a visiting session) . Then follows a list of 30 names, sent to the head of the regional department of the NKVD for the Northern Mining Administration which was also located in the village of Khatynnakh. One name from this list was crossed out. And then there is a receipt from Maksimov, the head of the "komandirovka Serpantinnaya", that he received 29 convicts. Probably, usually the "troika" made their decisions, even without having case records before their eyes.

Number of victims
Alexander Mikaberidze estimates the number of victims at 30 thousands, shot or died of exhaustion. Robert Conquest says 26,000 people were killed in Kolyma in 1938 in "Serpantinka-type operations". Post-Soviet Russian researchers point out that Conquest did not have access to the archives and his numbers are often overstated. At the same time, archival documents about the Dalstroy camp system were withdrawn from the files in 1953, 1958 and 1961 and probably destroyed. The Russian historian Navasardov found out that there were two "troikas" of the NKVD, who considered the cases of prisoners at Dalstroy in pursuance of order No. 00447. The first "troika" issued 2,428 execution orders. Then the leadership of Dalstroy under the head of Eduard Berzin was arrested and mostly executed, and a new team sent from Moscow took up the proceeding of the prisoners' cases in December 1937. The new troika sentenced 5801 people to death in 11 months. The historian points out that these death sentences were carried out both in Magadan and Serpantinka, but does not give the number of those executed in the second case. Also, not all sentences were carried out. Russian historians Batsaev and Kozlov note that there is still a lot of unknown in the activities of the first "troika". Thus, the number of death sentences handed down in August–September 1937, when the operation began in execution of order No. 004447, is unknown, as well as the composition of the first "troika".

The book Ships will come for us provides data on the number of people shot at the "Stan Khatynnakh" (that is, on Serpantinka) on some days:
February 4, 1938, Stan Khatynnakh, - 56 people,
February 5, in the same place - 17 people,
February 7, in the same place - 204 people,
February 24, in same place, - 53 people,
March 4–5, in the same place, - 94 people,
March 7, in the same place, - 70 people,
March 8, in the same place, - 64 people,
March 9, in the same place - 157 people,
March 10–14, in the same place - 253 people.

The Gulag Archipelago (cited by Conquest) states that 30-50 people were shot in Serpantinka a day. Eyewitness I. Taratin watched as 70 people were shot in one night.

Memory

On June 22, 1991 a monument was opened near the pass Khatynnakh, where road from the village of Yagodnoye, that departs from the Kolyma highway, goes toward the former village (urochishche) Khatynnakh. It was one of the first monuments in the USSR to victims of political repressions.

The Mask of Sorrow monument located in the city of Magadan contains 11 concrete blocks with the names of the GULAG camps in Kolyma, including Serpantinka.

Varlam Shalamov mentioned this camp (sometimes also under the name "Serpantinnaya") in his works. Thus, he wrote:

Criticism
Documentary evidence of the existence of the prison has not yet been found.
However, there is no evidence of official scientific expeditions and excavations at the supposed site of the prison. To accurately determine the location of the prison, it is necessary to organize a scientific archaeological expedition.
	
No mass graves were found at the site of the alleged location of the prison.
	
All available information about the prison is ultimately based on inmate folklore.
In addition to the folklore of prisoners, there are testimonies of witnesses, more than ten people who were in the period of imprisonment near this prison.

See also

Gulag
Kolyma
Stalinism
Dalstroy

Sevvostlag
Great Purge
Eduard Berzin
Sandarmokh

Discussion of the deleted page "Serpentinka" in the Russian Wikipedia (in Russian)

References

External links
Photo report about visiting the monument on the road from Yagodnoye to Khatynnakh (Russian text).
Location of human remains discovered in 2004 by gold diggers (presumably a camp cemetery).

Sources

Kolyma – Off to the Unknown – Stalin's Notorious Prison Camps in Siberia by Ayyub Baghirov (1906–1973)

Great Purge
Joseph Stalin
NKVD
Political repression in the Soviet Union
Stalinism
Mass murder in 1937
Mass murder in 1938
History of the Russian Far East